Hosťovce is a village and municipality in the Zlaté Moravce District of the Nitra Region, in western-central Slovakia.

See also
 List of municipalities and towns in Slovakia

References

Genealogical resources

The records for genealogical research are available at the state archive "Statny Archiv in Nitra, Slovakia"

 Roman Catholic church records (births/marriages/deaths): 1723-1894 (parish B)
 Lutheran church records (births/marriages/deaths): 1827-1894 (parish B)

External links
http://www.e-obce.sk/obec/hostovce-zlatemoravce/hostovce.html
Surnames of living people in Hostovce

Villages and municipalities in Zlaté Moravce District